Pere Aragonès i Garcia (born 16 November 1982) is a Catalan lawyer and politician from Spain, serving as the President of the Government of Catalonia since 22 May 2021. He previously served between 2018 and 2021 as Vice President and Minister of Economy and Finance of Catalonia, as well as Acting President since 28 September 2020. He is a member of the Republican Left of Catalonia (ERC) political party.

Born in 1982 in Pineda de Mar, Aragonès studied law at the Open University of Catalonia and economics at the University of Barcelona before becoming a lawyer and an academic. He was a member of the Parliament of Catalonia from December 2006 to January 2016 when he was appointed Secretary of Economy in the Catalan government. He was a member of the municipal council in Pineda de Mar from May 2011 to April 2018 and was appointed Vice President and Minister of Economy and Finance of Catalonia in June 2018.

Early life
Aragonès was born on 16 November 1982 in Pineda de Mar, Catalonia, Spain. His grandfather , a textile businessman and real estate tycoon, also served as the mayor of his hometown during the Francoist dictatorship, continuing in the post throughout the Transition as a member of Democratic Reform of Catalonia and People's Alliance up until 1987. In the 1990s, his father served as municipal councillor for Convergence and Union in Pineda. He has a degree in law from the Open University of Catalonia and a master's degree in economic history from the University of Barcelona (UB). He has also studied public policy and economic development at the Harvard University's Kennedy School of Government. He is currently studying for a Ph.D. in economic history from UB.

Aragonès joined the Young Republican Left of Catalonia, the youth wing of the Republican Left of Catalonia, in 1998 and was its national spokesperson from 2003 to 2007. He joined ERC in 2000. He has been a member of ERC's executive since 2003 and is currently number three in the party. He is also a member of the Òmnium Cultural.

Career

Aragonès worked at a law firm specialising in corporate and public administration law. He was a researcher at the Institut Ignasi Villalonga d'Economia i Empresa and an associate professor at the University of Perpignan. In January 2016 he was appointed the Generalitat de Catalunya's Secretary of Economy in January 2016.

At the 2003 regional election Aragonès was placed 38th on the Republican Left of Catalonia's list of candidates in the Province of Barcelona but the party only managed to win 13 seats in the province and as a result he was not elected. At the 2006 regional election he was placed 12th on the ERC's list of candidates in the Province of Barcelona but the party only managed to win 11 seats in the province and as a result he was not elected again. In December 2006, he was appointed to the Parliament of Catalonia following the resignation of Josep Huguet.

Aragonès was placed 7th on ERC's list of candidates 2010 in the Province of Barcelona and, although the party only managed to win six seats in the province, he was re-elected after the second placed candidate Ernest Benach declined to take his seat in the Catalan parliament. He was re-elected at the 2012 and 2015 regional elections. He resigned from parliament upon being appointed Secretary of Economy.

Aragonès contested the 2011 local elections as a Republican Left of Catalonia-Junts per Pineda-Acord Municipal (ERC-JP-AM) electoral alliance candidate in Pineda de Mar and was elected. He was re-elected at the 2015 local elections. He resigned from Pineda de Mar Municipal Council in April 2018.

On 19 May 2018, newly elected President of Catalonia Quim Torra nominated a new government in which Aragonès was to be Vice President and Minister of Economy and Finance. He was sworn in on 2 June 2018 at the Palau de la Generalitat de Catalunya.

On 15 March 2020 Aragonès announced on Twitter that he had contracted COVID-19 during the COVID-19 pandemic in Spain.

On 28 September 2020, following the rule issued by the Spanish Supreme Court that barred President of Catalonia Joaquim Torra from chairing any public office, he assumed the position as acting President of the region.

On 21 May 2021, after the 2021 Catalan elections and an agreement with Junts, he became the first President of Catalonia from Esquerra Republicana since Josep Tarradellas in the 1980s.

In June 2021, he welcomed the decision by Pedro Sánchez to pardon those convicted for the 2017 independence attempt but said that he would pursue for an amnesty for all those involved in that year's events, which would benefit over 3,000 people.

Electoral history

References

External links
 
 
 

1982 births
Academics from Catalonia
Lawyers from Catalonia
Municipal councillors in the province of Barcelona
Economy ministers of Catalonia
Finance ministers of Catalonia
Living people
Members of the 8th Parliament of Catalonia
Members of the 9th Parliament of Catalonia
Members of the 10th Parliament of Catalonia
Members of the 11th Parliament of Catalonia
People from Maresme
Presidents of the Government of Catalonia
Republican Left of Catalonia politicians
Torra Government
University of Barcelona alumni
Vice Presidents of Catalonia